Elim is a city in Nome Census Area, Alaska, United States. At the 2010 census the population was 330, up from 313 in 2000.

Geography
Elim is located at  (64.617734, -162.256705).

Climate
Elim has a subarctic climate (Köppen Dfc).

Natural history
A number of flora and fauna are found in the Elim area. This is the westernmost location for the range of Black Spruce, Picea mariana.

Demographics

Elim first appeared on the 1920 U.S. Census as an unincorporated village. It was formally incorporated in 1970.

As of the census of 2000, there were 313 people, 84 households, and 69 families residing in the city. The racial makeup of the city was 5.11% White, 92.65% Native American, and 2.24% from two or more races.

Of the 84 households, 60.7% had children under the age of 18 living with them, 57.1% were married couples living together, 15.5% had a female householder with no husband present, and 16.7% were non-families. 14.3% of all households were made up of individuals, and 2.4% had someone living alone who was 65 years of age or older.  The average household size was 3.73 and the average family size was 4.16.

In the city, the age distribution of the population shows 41.9% under the age of 18, 10.5% from 18 to 24, 26.2% from 25 to 44, 14.7% from 45 to 64, and 6.7% who were 65 years of age or older.  The median age was 24 years. For every 100 females, there were 131.9 males.  For every 100 females age 18 and over, there were 122.0 males.

The median income for a household in the city was $40,179, and the median income for a family was $40,893. Males had a median income of $25,938 versus $21,250 for females. The per capita income for the city was $10,300.  About 8.0% of families and 7.9% of the population were below the poverty line, including 7.3% of those under age 18 and 12.5% of those age 65 or over.

Transportation

Airports
The Elim Airport is a state-owned airport with scheduled passenger flights. Also located in Elim is the Moses Point Airport, which is privately owned by the Elim Native Corporation.

Education
Elim is served by the Bering Strait School District. Aniguiin School serves grades Pre-K through 12.

Boulder Creek uranium mine controversy
In 2005, mining company Full Metal Minerals announced a partnership with Triex Minerals Corporation to develop a uranium deposit north of Elim. Development of the site began with survey and exploration work in Sept 2005. Initial drilling exploration was completed in July 2006, confirming deposits of "sandstone-hosted uranium" at the Boulder Creek site in Death Valley, north of Elim.

The Boulder Creek mine site is located on part of the Tubutulik River. Serious water and air pollution risks, including radioactive byproducts, have been identified with "in-situ leeching", the type of uranium mining proposed for the site. Villagers have raised concerns that radioactive by-products of uranium mining would adversely affect the plants, fish, and wildlife on which they rely. In September 2007, Irene Murray of Aniguiin High School in Elim wrote an open letter to Alaska Gov. Sarah Palin, drawing attention to projected impacts on the local environment and human health. Protests led by Elim Students Against Uranium (ESAU) have included demonstrations in 2008 and 2009 at the Iditarod Trail Sled Dog Race ceremonial start, and on the Iditarod trail in Elim.

The village has raised legal concerns over the project that include an alleged failure by the federal Bureau of Land Management to provide adequate public notice and public comment periods regarding the Boulder Creek mine project. Portions of the regulatory process are under the purview of the Nuclear Regulatory Commission.

References

Cities in Alaska
Cities in Nome Census Area, Alaska
Populated coastal places in Alaska on the Pacific Ocean